Gerald Lee Augustine (born July 24, 1952) is an American former professional baseball pitcher, who played in Major League Baseball (MLB) for the Milwaukee Brewers, from 1975 to 1984. In 1976, he was named to the Topps All-Star Rookie Team.

Augustine formerly coached baseball for the University of Wisconsin–Milwaukee Panthers. Currently, he is a studio analyst for the Brewers on Bally Sports Wisconsin.

Augustine's nephew, James Augustine, played professional basketball for the Orlando Magic.

See also
List of Major League Baseball players who spent their entire career with one franchise

References

External links

1952 births
Living people
Águilas Cibaeñas players
American expatriate baseball players in the Dominican Republic
American expatriate baseball players in Canada
Baseball players from Wisconsin
Columbus Clippers players
Danville Warriors players
Iowa Cubs players
Louisville Redbirds players
Major League Baseball pitchers
Milwaukee Brewers announcers
Milwaukee Brewers players
Milwaukee Panthers baseball coaches
Wisconsin–La Crosse Eagles baseball players
People from Kewaunee, Wisconsin
Rochester Red Wings players
Sacramento Solons players
Vancouver Canadians players